John Underwood (died October 1624) was an early 17th-century actor, a member of the King's Men, the theatrics company of William Shakespeare.

Career
Underwood began as a boy player with the Children of the Chapel, and was cast in that company's productions of Ben Jonson's Cynthia's Revels (1600) and The Poetaster (1601). In 1608 or soon after, he joined the King's Men along with William Ostler, another former member of the Chapel Children troupe. Underwood was a member of the cast of the King's Men's production of Jonson's The Alchemist in 1610, and was in the casts of many productions that followed, including Jonson's Catiline (1611) and John Webster's The Duchess of Malfi (the revival of c. 1621).

In the 25 cast lists added to plays in the second Beaumont and Fletcher folio of 1679, Underwood is mentioned in the casts of 18 dramas:

 Bonduca
 The Custom of the Country
 The Double Marriage
 The False One
 The Humorous Lieutenant
 The Island Princess
 The Knight of Malta
 The Laws of Candy
 The Little French Lawyer

 The Lovers' Progress
 The Loyal Subject
 The Maid in the Mill
 The Pilgrim
 The Queen of Corinth
 The Sea Voyage
 Valentinian
 A Wife for a Month
 Women Pleased

His total appearances equals those of Joseph Taylor and Robert Benfield, and is exceeded only by John Lowin's 21. Considering that his career was two decades shorter than Taylor's or Benfield's (both of whom acted until the theatres closed in 1642), Underwood was clearly a mainstay of the company during his acting career.

His will
Underwood died between 4 and 10 October 1624. His last will and testament was drawn up on the 4th; a codicil was appended on the 11th, after his death.  He left his property in a trust for his five minor children (John, Elizabeth, Burbage, Thomas, and Isabel). His executors and overseers, who included John Lowin, Henry Condell, and John Heminges, were left 11 shillings each to buy memorial rings. Shakespeare's 1616 will had left Condell, Heminges and Richard Burbage 28 shillings sixpence (28s. 6d.) each for the same purpose.

Theatre shares
Underwood's property included shares in the King's Men's theatres, the Globe and the Blackfriars, as well as a share in the Curtain Theatre in Shoreditch. The last is a significant point. Thomas Pope, a member of the Lord Chamberlain's Men who died in 1603, had also possessed a share in the Curtain and had listed it in his will. As far as is known, Henry Lanman, who built the Curtain in 1577, had originally run that theatre as his private business; yet sometime before 1603 the Curtain had clearly been re-organized into a shareholders' enterprise. The fact that two men of Shakespeare's troupe owned shares in the Curtain suggests that this re-organization occurred around the time the Lord Chamberlain's Men were acting at the Curtain in the 1597–99 period. (Pope was a member of the company at that time, while Underwood was not; the implication is that Underwood purchased his share in the Curtain from another troupe member.)

When the brothers Richard and Cuthbert Burbage built The Globe Theatre in early 1599, they organized it as a shareholders' concern, keeping 50% of the business for themselves and dividing the other 50% among four of the Lord Chamberlain's Men – Shakespeare, Pope, Heminges, and Augustine Phillips. (Originally William Kempe was meant to be the seventh partner, but he sold out to the other four minority shareholders, giving each of them a 12.5% stake instead of 10%.) It has been argued that the Burbages pursued this arrangement out of necessity: their financial problems involving The Theatre and the Blackfriars left them in need of outside investors. It is generally held that the Globe arrangement constituted the first case in which the standard sharers' partnership in a playing company was extended to theatre construction and ownership. Yet the Curtain Theatre shares owned by Underwood and Pope suggest that the Globe was perhaps not the initial instance of such an arrangement, and that the Burbages applied to the Globe a structure that was already familiar to the Lord Chamberlain's Men from the Curtain.

Notes

References
 Chambers, E. K. The Elizabethan Stage. 4 Volumes, Oxford, Clarendon Press, 1923.
 Gurr, Andrew. The Shakespearean Stage 1574–1642. Third edition, Cambridge, Cambridge University Press, 1992.
 Halliday, F.E. A Shakespeare Companion 1564–1964. Baltimore, Penguin, 1964.

King's Men (playing company)
Year of birth unknown
1624 deaths
17th-century English male actors
English male stage actors